Igreja de São Cristóvão is a church located in São Paulo, Brazil on the Avenida Tiradentes.

References

Roman Catholic churches in São Paulo
Neoclassical church buildings in Brazil